Ashley Davies (born 10 January 1995 in Chesterfield) is an English professional squash player. As of February 2018, he was ranked number 101 in the world.

References

1995 births
Living people
English male squash players
Rochester Yellowjackets men's squash players